Carl Edgar Powis (January 11, 1928 – May 10, 1999) was an American professional baseball player.  Nicknamed "Jug," Powis played right field for the Baltimore Orioles of Major League Baseball during the first three weeks of the 1957 season. In 15 games and 13 starts, he had eight hits in 41 at-bats, including three doubles and one triple, with two runs batted in.

He attended Murray State University and signed with the St. Louis Browns—the future Orioles' organization—in 1948. He spent nine years in the Browns/Orioles farm system before his 1957 trial with Baltimore.

His pro career continued through 1959 in the minors, mostly at the Double-A level.   He died in Houston, Texas, at the age of 71.

References

External links
Baseball Reference.com page

1928 births
1999 deaths
Anderson Rebels players
Atlanta Crackers players
Baltimore Orioles players
Baseball players from Philadelphia
Dallas Rangers players
Dayton Indians players
Major League Baseball right fielders
Mayfield Clothiers players
Murray State Racers baseball players
New Orleans Pelicans (baseball) players
Portland Beavers players
San Antonio Missions players
Vancouver Mounties players
Victoria Rosebuds players
Wichita Falls Spudders players
Wichita Indians players